Holy Family Cristo Rey High School is a private Catholic high school in the Titusville neighborhood of Birmingham, Alabama.  It is located in the Diocese of Birmingham in Alabama and is sponsored by the Passionists.

Background
Fathers from the Holy Cross Province of the Congregation of the Passion ran Holy Family High School, founded in 1943. In 2007, with changing demographics in the Ensley area, the need was perceived for a school that would assist those in poverty. After contact with the Cristo Rey Network the first Cristo Rey school in the South was opened. The school combines academic study and a corporate work-study program for students from economically challenged families to enable them to graduate from high school prepare for college. 100% of HFCR graduates have been accepted into college.

In 2019, Holy Family moved from its original location in Ensley to the Titusville neighborhood, acquiring the former Center Street Middle School from the Birmingham City Schools.

Cristo Rey Network schools employ a Corporate Work Study Program that provides students with work experiences. Every student works five full days per month to fund the majority of his or her education. Students work at law firms, banks, hospitals, universities, and other professional Corporate Partners, over 70 in all.

Activities 
A select group of Student Ambassadors from the upper three years represents the school to the public and to prospective students, volunteering many hours of their time to attract, assess, and mentor prospective students.

Nine sports are sponsored by the school: volleyball, basketball, track, baseball, soccer, softball, lacrosse, cheerleading and dance. Among the school's more successful extracurriculars is an investment club which teaches students how to save and invest for the future.

Notable graduates

 Michael Choy - Attorney
 Annie Easley - NASA computer scientist
 Demetrius Newton Jr - Communications Instructor at Miles College.

References

Further reading
 Kearney, G. R. More Than a Dream: The Cristo Rey Story: How One School's Vision Is Changing the World. Chicago, Ill: Loyola Press, 2008.

External links
 School Website
 - Cristo Rey Network
 Fr. John P. Foley honored with Presidential Citizen's Medal
60 minutes
Cristo Rey Featured in WashPost column by George Will
 Boston Globe - With sense of purpose, students cut class for a day 
 Bill & Melinda Gates Foundation - Success of Innovative Urban Catholic School Sparks Major Investment

Catholic secondary schools in Alabama
Educational institutions established in 1943
Cristo Rey Network
High schools in Birmingham, Alabama
Schools in Jefferson County, Alabama
Poverty-related organizations
1943 establishments in Alabama
African-American Roman Catholic schools